is a passenger railway station located in the Yasuura neighborhood of the city of Yokosuka, Kanagawa Prefecture, Japan, operated by the private railway company Keikyū.

Lines
Kenritsudaigaku Station is served by the Keikyū Main Line and is located 51.1 kilometers from the northern terminus of the line at Shinagawa  Station in Tokyo.

Station layout
The station consists of an elevated single island platform, with the station building underneath. The platform is only long enough to handle six-car trains.

Platforms

History
The Shōnan Electric Railway merged with the Keihin Electric Railway on November 1, 1941 and became the Keihin Electric Express Railway from June 1, 1948. It assumed its present name from February 1, 2004. The station building was rebuilt in April 2005.

Keikyū introduced station numbering to its stations on 21 October 2010; Kenritsudaigaku Station was assigned station number KK60.

Passenger statistics
In fiscal 2019, the station was used by an average of 12,350 passengers daily. 

The passenger figures for previous years are as shown below.

Surrounding area
Yokosuka City Otsu Elementary School
Yokosuka City Otsu Junior High School
Kanagawa Prefectural Yokosuka Otsu High School
Kanagawa University of Human Services

See also
 List of railway stations in Japan

References

External links

 

Railway stations in Kanagawa Prefecture
Railway stations in Japan opened in 1930
Keikyū Main Line
Railway stations in Yokosuka, Kanagawa